Charles Philip Bednarik (May 1, 1925 – March 21, 2015), nicknamed "Concrete Charlie", was an American professional football player in the National Football League (NFL). He has been ranked one of the hardest hitting tacklers in NFL history and was one of the league's last two-way players. His November 20, 1960 tackle of Frank Gifford in an Eagles game against the New York Giants at Yankee Stadium, known simply as The Hit, is widely considered one of the hardest tackles and most notable plays in NFL history.

A Slovak American from the Bethlehem, Pennsylvania in the Lehigh Valley region of eastern Pennsylvania, Bednarik played for the Philadelphia Eagles for his entire 14-year NFL career from 1949 through 1962. In 1967, in his first year of eligibility, he was inducted into the Pro Football Hall of Fame.

Early life
Bednarik was born in Bethlehem, Pennsylvania on May 1, 1925. His parents emigrated from Široké, a village in eastern Slovakia, five years earlier, settling in Bethlehem and working for Bethlehem Steel. He attended school at SS. Cyril & Methodius in Bethlehem, which was a Slovak parochial school taught in Slovak.

High school
Bednarik attended Liberty High School in Bethlehem, where he played football.

Military service
Following graduation from Liberty High School, Bednarik entered the United States Army Air Forces and served as a B-24 waist gunner with the Eighth Air Force. He flew on 30 combat missions over Germany and was awarded the Air Medal, four Oak Leaf Clusters, the European-African-Middle Eastern Campaign Medal, and four Battle Stars.

College
Bednarik subsequently attended the University of Pennsylvania in Philadelphia, where he was a 60-minute man, excelling as both center and linebacker, and sometimes as a punter. He was a three-time All-American and was voted entry into the College Football Hall of Fame along with two of his teammates on the 1947 Penn team, George Savitsky and tailback Tony Minisi, and his coach, George Munger. At Penn, Bednarik was third in Heisman Trophy voting in 1948 and won the Maxwell Award that year. In 1969, he was voted by a panel of sportswriters, coaches and hall of fame players as "The Greatest Center of All-Time."

NFL career
Bednarik was the first player selected in the 1949 NFL Draft by the Philadelphia Eagles, where he went on to start on both offense (as a center) and defense (as a linebacker) for the Eagles. He was a member of the Eagles' NFL Championship teams in 1949 and 1960. In the final play of the 1960 NFL Championship Game, Bednarik, the last Eagle between Green Bay's Jim Taylor and the end zone, tackled Taylor at the Eagles' eight-yard line, and remained atop Taylor as the final seconds ticked off the clock, ensuring the Packers could not run another play and preserving a 17–13 Eagles victory. The controversy surrounding this play led to the NFL putting in a rule penalizing defensive players for not allowing an offensive player to get up off the field.

Gifford hit

On November 20, 1960, Bednarik knocked New York Giants running back Frank Gifford out of football for over 18 months with one of the most famous tackles in NFL history, sometimes referred to simply as The Hit. Bednarik's clothes line tackle of Gifford dropped Gifford immediately to the ground, and he immediately went unconscious. Gifford was transported from the field on a stretcher and then to a local hospital, where he was diagnosed with a deep concussion. 

Bednarik was criticized after the game by Giants players and fans for apparently celebrating Gifford's injury and a picture from Sports Illustrated became iconic, showing Bednarik in mid-celebration, right above Gifford as he laid on the field, unconscious. Bednarik defended himself by saying that he was celebrating the fumble caused by the hit, which the Eagles recovered and was going to clinch the game for them, and the right to play for the NFL Championship. Years later, Gifford called the hit "a clean shot", and said, "Chuck hit me exactly the way I would have hit him."

Quarrel with Noll
Bednarik had a famous quarrel with Chuck Noll, who once, as a player for the Cleveland Browns, smashed him in the face during a fourth-down punting play. A few years later, Bednarik punched Noll in an on-field confrontation after a game, in retaliation. NFL commissioner Bert Bell fined Bednarik $500 and ordered him to apologize to Noll for the punch. According to Bednarik, when he gave the apology, Noll simply responded, "Bullshit."

Accomplishments and legacy
Bednarik proved extremely durable, missing just three games in his 14 seasons. He was named All-Pro eight times and was the last of the NFL's "Sixty-Minute Men," players who played both offense and defense on a regular basis.

Bednarik's nickname, "Concrete Charlie," originated from his off-season career as a concrete salesman for the Warner Company, not (contrary to popular belief) from his reputation as a ferocious tackler. Nonetheless, sportswriter Hugh Brown of The Evening Bulletin in Philadelphia, credited with bestowing the nickname, remarked that Bednarik "is as hard as the concrete he sells."

Bednarik served as an analyst on the HBO program Inside The NFL for its inaugural season in 1977–78.

In 1999, he was ranked number 54 on The Sporting News' list of the 100 Greatest Football Players.  This made him the highest-ranking player to have spent his entire career with the Eagles, the highest-ranking offensive center and the eighth-ranked linebacker in all of professional football.

In 2010, Bednarik was ranked number 35 on the NFL Network's "The Top 100: NFL's Greatest Players". Ranked one spot ahead of Bednarik at #34 was Deion Sanders, a player for whom Bednarik has held open contempt in regards to being a two-way player. Bednarik was not the highest placed Eagle on the NFL Network's list. That distinction was held by Reggie White at number 7.

Opinions on current NFL players
Bednarik was an outspoken, even bitter critic of modern NFL players for playing on only one side of the ball, calling them "pussyfoots", noting that they "suck air after five plays" and that they "couldn't tackle my wife Emma". He even criticized Troy Brown of the New England Patriots and Deion Sanders of the Dallas Cowboys, two players who also have played both offense and defense. Bednarik noted that Brown and Sanders saw time at both wide receiver and cornerback, positions that did not require as much contact as he endured while playing both center and linebacker.

Relationship with the Eagles
Bednarik's former Eagles number, 60, has been retired by the Eagles in honor of his achievements with the team and is one of only nine numbers retired in the history of the franchise.

When the Eagles established their Honor Roll in 1987, Bednarik was one of the first class of inductees. He attended reunions for the 25th anniversary of the 1960 NFL Championship team in 1985 and the 40th anniversary of the 1948–49 NFL Championship team in 1988 (though he had not played for the 1948 team), held in pregame ceremonies at Veterans Stadium.

Bednarik quarreled with current Eagles owner Jeffrey Lurie in 1996. Lurie refused to buy 100 copies of Bednarik's new book for $15 each for the entire team, as that was against NFL rules, and that grudge carried over into the Eagles' Super Bowl appearance in 2005, when he openly rooted against his former team. He was a consistent critic of several league issues, including his pension, today's salaries, and one-way players.

During Eagles training camp in the summer of 2006, Bednarik and the Eagles reconciled, seemingly ending the feud between Bednarik and Lurie. At the same time, however, Bednarik made disparaging remarks regarding Reggie White, leading to a somewhat lukewarm reception of the reconciliation by Eagles' fans. In the edition of August 4 of Allentown's Morning Call newspaper, however, it was reported that Bednarik apologized, stating he had been confused, and meant to make the statement about former Eagles wide receiver Terrell Owens.

Health and death

2011 hospitalization
On March 26, 2011, Bednarik was reportedly taken to St. Luke's Hospital in Bethlehem. Hospital spokesmen stated that he was "in serious condition", but provided no further details. The next day, however, it was announced that he was doing fine and had no pre-existing medical conditions. His son-in-law stated that he had passed out from shortness of breath and low blood pressure but did not suffer a heart attack or anything related and was expected to make a full recovery.

In the final years of his life, Bednarik resided in Coopersburg, Pennsylvania in the Lehigh Valley with his wife Emma.

Death
Bednarik died at 4:23 a.m. on March 21, 2015 in Coopersburg, Pennsylvania after having fallen ill the previous day. He was 89. Although the Philadelphia Eagles released a statement saying he died after a "brief illness", Bednarik's eldest daughter, Charlene Thomas, disputed that claim, saying he had Alzheimer's disease and had been suffering from dementia for years and that football-related injuries played a role in his decline.

See also
Chuck Bednarik Award, awarded annually in Bednarik's honor to the best defensive player in college football
The Hit (Chuck Bednarik)

References

External links

Video of "The Hit" on NFL Films' on YouTube page

1925 births
2015 deaths
American football centers
American football linebackers
Penn Quakers football players
Philadelphia Eagles players
All-American college football players
College Football Hall of Fame inductees
Eastern Conference Pro Bowl players
Maxwell Award winners
National Football League first-overall draft picks
Pro Football Hall of Fame inductees
United States Army Air Forces personnel of World War II
Deaths from Alzheimer's disease
Neurological disease deaths in Pennsylvania
United States Army Air Forces soldiers
Liberty High School (Bethlehem, Pennsylvania) alumni
Sportspeople from Bethlehem, Pennsylvania
Players of American football from Pennsylvania
American people of Slovak descent
National Football League players with retired numbers
Recipients of the Air Medal